Lil' Chopper Toy is the second album by Atlanta 18-year-old rapper Baby D. It was released in 2002 under Big Oomp Records.

Track list 
 "Intro" (feat. Big Oomp)
 "Get Crunk" (feat. Lil' C)
 "Live In Concert" (skit)
 "ATL Hoe!" (feat. Lil Jon, Pastor Troy & Archie)
 "Stomp That Shit" (feat. Lil' C)
 "Gangsta Walk" (feat. Jazze Pha, Lil' C & Slim J)
 "We Got The Club Jumpin" (feat. Lil' Will)
 "Big Korey" (skit)
 "Eastside Vs Westside Remix"
 "We Came To Get That Cheese" (feat. 8Ball & Thorough)
 "Ridin In A Chevy, Pt. 2" (feat. Lil' C)
 "Make Yo Shoulders Jump"
 "Slammin Cadillac Doors"
 "We Too Deep" (feat. Lil' C & Loko)
 "Gregg Street Party" (skit)
 "Let's Start A Fight" (feat. Slim J)
 "Suckas And Bustas"
 "Drop A Little Lower" (feat. Ying Yang Twins)
 "Bouncin" (feat. Lil' C & Loko)
 "Do You Wanna"
 Untitled hidden track

2002 albums
Baby D (rapper) albums